This is a list of bridges and tunnels on the National Register of Historic Places in the U.S. state of West Virginia.

References

 
West Virginia
Bridges
Bridges